Albert Brendel may refer to:

 Albert Brendel (Wehrmacht officer), Knight's Cross of the Iron Cross recipient
 Albert Heinrich Brendel (1827–1878), German painter